Don Malkames (April 7, 1904 – November 24, 1986) was a cinematographer and  inventor in the history of motion picture technology.

Life and work
Malkames began his career at age 17 as an assistant cameraman at Hollywood's  William Fox Studio. During the 1930s, he worked in the New York area as a director of photography; he was for several years head of the camera department at the Astoria Studios.

Malkames also invented a lenticular motion-picture process, designed a newsreel camera and served as a technical adviser to several film museums across the country.

He was the father of cinematographer Karl Malkames.

He died at 82 in Yonkers, New York.

Select features as cinematographer 

The Shadow Laughs (1933)
Victims of Persecution (1933)
Kol Nidre (1939)
Paradise in Harlem (1939)
Motel the Operator (1940)
Overture to Glory (1940)
Eli Eli (1940)
Her Second Mother (1940)
The Jewish Melody (1940)
The Great Advisor (1940)
The Music Master (Le Père Chopin) (1945)
That Man of Mine (1946)
Beware (1946)
Hi-De-Ho (1947)
Citizen Saint (1947)
Reet, Petite, and Gone (1947)
Junction 88 (1947)
Miracle in Harlem (1948)
Jigsaw (1949)
Project X (1949)
Sarumba (1950)
Cry Murder (1950)
So Young So Bad (1950)
St. Benny the Dip (1951)
That Man from Tangier (1953)
Basin Street Revue (1956)
The Burglar (1957)
Terror in the City (1964)

References

External links
The Malkames Collection 
The First CineMakers at AbelCine
IMDB: Don Malkames

1904 births
1986 deaths
American cinematographers